The WS-20 is a high-bypass turbofan currently powering the Y-20 family of strategic airlifters in limited numbers. It is based on the core of the low-bypass turbofan Shenyang WS-10A.

Testing with the Ilyushin Il-76 began by 2013. Development continued in 2021. Images of Y-20 equipped with WS-20s emerged in 2022.

Applications
 Xian Y-20

See also
 CJ-1000A
 WS-10
 WS-15

References

High-bypass turbofan engines
2010s turbofan engines